Halcampidae is a family of sea anemones. Members of this family usually live with their column buried in sand or other soft substrates.

Genera
Genera in the family include:
 Acthelmis Lütken, 1875
 Cactosoma Danielssen, 1890
 Calamactinia Carlgren, 1949
 Calamactis Carlgren, 1951
 Halcampa Gosse, 1858
 Halcampaster
 Halcampella Andres, 1883
 Halcampoides Danielssen, 1890
 Halianthella
 Kodioides
 Mena
 Metedwardsia
 Neohalcampa
 Parahalcampa
 Pentactinia Carlgren, 1900
 Scytophorus Hertwig, 1882
 Siphonactinopsis Carlgren, 1921

Characteristics
Species of Halcampidae mostly have elongated columns which are sometimes differentiated into different regions. The base is usually rounded but in some species it is flattened. There is no sphincter. There are up to forty tentacles, all of equal length. There are up to twenty pairs of perfect mesenteries (internal partitions) with strong retractors. There are one or two siphonoglyphs (ciliated grooves).

References

 
Metridioidea
Cnidarian families